The Opioid and Drug Abuse Commission was a commission that advised the Trump administration on combating the ongoing opioid epidemic claiming more than 30,000 American fatalities annually in the United States. The commission was chaired by New Jersey Governor Chris Christie. The commission disbanded in December 2017.

Commission members
 Chris Christie, Governor of New Jersey, Chairman
 Charlie Baker, Governor of Massachusetts
 Roy Cooper, Governor of North Carolina
 Patrick J. Kennedy, former U.S. Representative from Rhode Island
 Bertha Madras, former Deputy Director of the Office of National Drug Control Policy
 Pam Bondi, Attorney General of Florida

Mission
According to a draft of its executive order of creation, the panel was charged with responsibilities to:
 Identify federal funding which could be directed toward medical treatments and aftercare.
 Identify areas in the U.S. with substandard opioid treatment options.
 Identify possible ways to combat the crisis through changes to prescription-writing standards.
 Identify possible ways to provide better addiction treatment options to released convicts.
 Receive support from the Office of National Drug Control Policy, the director of the latter's representing the U.S. President in interactions with the panel.

The commission's interim recommendations were slated to be due within 90 days of its inauguration and a final report, in October 2017. The final report is: The President's Commission on Combatting Drug Addiction and the Opiod Crisis - final report

See also
 List of executive actions by Donald Trump

References

History of drug control
Opioid epidemic
Drug Enforcement Administration
History of drug control in the United States
United States national commissions
Presidency of Donald Trump
2017 establishments in the United States